A śramaṇa or samaṇa (or , shāmén) means "one who labours, toils, or exerts themselves for some higher or religious purpose" or "seeker, one who performs acts of austerity, ascetic".  During its development, the term came to refer to several non-Brahmanical ascetic religions parallel to but separate from the Vedic religion. The Śramaṇa tradition includes primarily Jainism, Buddhism, and others such as the Ājīvika.

The śramaṇa religions became popular in the same circles of mendicants from greater Magadha that led to the development of spiritual practices, as well as the popular concepts in all major Indian religions such as saṃsāra (the cycle of birth and death) and moksha (liberation from that cycle).

The Śramaṇic traditions have a diverse range of beliefs, ranging from accepting or denying the concept of soul, fatalism to free will, idealization of extreme asceticism to that of family life, renunciation, strict ahimsa (non-violence) and vegetarianism to permissibility of violence and meat-eating.

Etymology and origin

One of the earliest recorded uses of the word śramaṇa, in the sense of a mendicant, is in verse 4.3.22 of the Brihadaranyaka Upanishad composed by about the 6th century BCE. The concept of renunciation and monk-like lifestyle is found in Vedic literature, with terms such as yatis, rishis, and śramaṇas. The Vedic literature from pre-1000 BCE era, mentions Muni (मुनि, monks, mendicants, holy man). Rig Veda, for example, in Book 10 Chapter 136, mentions mendicants as those with kēśin (केशिन्, long-haired) and mala clothes (मल, dirty, soil-colored, yellow, orange, saffron) engaged in the affairs of mananat (mind, meditation).

The hymn uses the term vātaraśana (वातरशन) which means "girdled with wind". Some scholars have interpreted this to mean "sky-clad, naked monk" and therefore a synonym for Digambara (a Jainism sect). However, other scholars state that this could not be the correct interpretation because it is inconsistent with the words that immediately follow, "wearing soil-hued garments". The context likely means that the poet is describing the "munis" as moving like the wind, their garments pressed by the wind. According to Olivelle, it is unlikely that the vātaraśana implies a class within the Vedic context.

The earliest known explicit use of the term śramaṇa is found in section 2.7 of the Taittiriya Aranyaka, a layer within the Yajurveda (~1000 BCE, a scripture of Hinduism). It mentions śramaṇa Rishis and celibate Rishis.

Buddhist commentaries associate the word's etymology with the quieting of evil as in the following phrase from the 3rd century BCE Dhammapada, verse 265:  ("someone who has pacified evil is called ").

The word śramaṇa is postulated to be derived from the verbal root , meaning "to exert effort, labor or to perform austerity". The history of wandering monks in ancient India is partly untraceable. The term 'parivrajaka' was perhaps applicable to all the peripatetic monks of India, such as those found in Buddhism, Jainism and Brahmanism.

The śramaṇa refers to a variety of renunciate ascetic traditions from the middle of the 1st millennium BCE. The śramaṇas were individual, experiential and free-form traditions. The term "śramaṇas" is used sometimes to contrast them with "Brahmins" in terms of their religious models. Part of the śramaṇa tradition retained their distinct identity from Hinduism by rejecting the epistemic authority of the Vedas, while a part of the śramaṇa tradition became part of Hinduism as one stage in the Ashrama dharma, that is as renunciate sannyasins.

Pali samaṇa has been suggested as the ultimate origin of the word Evenki сама̄н (samān) "shaman", possibly via Middle Chinese or Tocharian B; however, the etymology of this word, which is also found in other Tungusic languages, is controversial (see ).

History

Several śramaṇa movements are known to have existed in India before the 6th century BCE (pre-Buddha, pre-Mahavira), and these influenced both the āstika and nāstika traditions of Indian philosophy. Martin Wiltshire states that the Śramaṇa tradition evolved in India over two phases, namely Paccekabuddha and Savaka phases, the former being the tradition of individual ascetic and latter of disciples, and that Buddhism and Jainism ultimately emerged from these as sectarian manifestations. These traditions drew upon already established Brahmanical concepts, states Wiltshire, to communicate their own distinct doctrines. Reginald Ray concurs that Śramaṇa movements already existed and were established traditions in pre-6th century BCE India, but disagrees with Wiltshire that they were nonsectarian before the arrival of Buddha.

According to the Jain Agamas and the Buddhist Pāli Canon, there were other śramaṇa leaders at the time of Buddha. In the Mahāparinibbāna Sutta (DN 16), a śramaṇa named Subhadda mentions:

Relationship with Vedism
The traditional view of scholars in the field, represented for example by Govind Chandra Pande in his 1957 study on the origins of Buddhism, is that Śramaṇa began as a "distinct and separate cultural and religious" tradition from Vedic religion.

Patrick Olivelle, a professor of Indology and known for his translations of major ancient Sanskrit works, states in his 1993 study that contrary to some representations, the original Śramaṇa tradition was a part of the Vedic one. He writes,

According to Olivelle, and other scholars such as Edward Crangle, the concept of Śramaṇa exists in the early Brahmanical literature. The term is used in an adjectival sense for sages who lived a special way of life that the Vedic culture considered extraordinary. However, Vedic literature does not provide details of that life. The term did not imply any opposition to either Brahmins or householders. In all likelihood states Olivelle, during the Vedic era, neither did the Śramaṇa concept refer to an identifiable class, nor to ascetic groups as it does in later Indian literature. Additionally, in the early texts, some pre-dating 3rd-century BCE ruler Ashoka, the Brahmana and Śramaṇa are neither distinct nor opposed. The distinction, according to Olivelle, in later Indian literature "may have been a later semantic development possibly influenced by the appropriation of the latter term [Sramana] by Buddhism and Jainism".

The Vedic society, states Olivelle, contained many people whose roots were non-Aryan who must have influenced the Aryan classes. However, it is difficult to identify and isolate these influences, in part because the vedic culture not only developed from influences but also from its inner dynamism and socio-economic developments.

According to Bronkhorst, the sramana culture arose in "Greater Magadha," which was Indo-Aryan, but not Vedic. In this culture, Kshatriyas were placed higher than Brahmins, and it rejected Vedic authority and rituals.

Pre-Buddhist śrāmana schools in Buddhist texts
Pande attributes the origin of Buddhism, not entirely to the Buddha, but to a "great religious ferment" towards the end of the Vedic period when the Brahmanic and Sramanic traditions intermingled.

The Buddhist text of the Samaññaphala Sutta identifies six pre-Buddhist śrāmana schools, identifying them by their leader. These six schools are represented in the text to have diverse philosophies, which according to Padmanabh Jaini, may be "a biased picture and does not give a true picture" of the Sramanic schools rivaling with Buddhism,

śrāmana movement of Purana Kassapa (Amoralism): believed in antinomian ethics. This ancient school asserted that there are no moral laws, nothing is moral or immoral, there is neither virtue nor sin.
śrāmana movement of Makkhali Gosala (Ajivika): believed in fatalism and determinism that everything is the consequence of nature and its laws. The school denied that there is free will, but believed that soul exists. Everything has its own individual nature, based on how one is constituted from elements. Karma and consequences are not due to free will, cannot be altered, everything is pre-determined, because of and including one's composition.
śrāmana movement of Ajita Kesakambali (Lokayata-Charvaka): believed in materialism. Denied that there is an after-life, any samsara, any karma, or any fruit of good or evil deeds. Everything including humans are composed of elemental matter, and when one dies one returns to those elements.
śrāmana movement of Pakudha Kaccayana: believed in atomism. Denied that there is a creator, knower. Believed that everything is made of seven basic building blocks that are eternal, neither created nor caused to be created. The seven blocks included earth, water, fire, air, happiness, pain and soul. All actions, including death is mere re-arrangement and interpenetration of one set of substances into another set of substances.
śrāmana movement of Mahavira (Jainism): believed in fourfold restraint, avoid all evil (see more below).
śrāmana movement of Sanjaya Belatthiputta (Ajñana): believed in absolute agnosticism. Refused to have any opinion either way about existence of or non-existence of after-life, karma, good, evil, free will, creator, soul, or other topics.

The pre-Buddhist śrāmana movements were organized Sanghagani (order of monks and ascetics), according to the Buddhist Samaññaphala Sutta. The six leaders above are described as a Sanghi (head of the order), Ganacariyo (teacher), Cirapabbajito (recluse), Yasassi and Neto (of repute and well known).

Jainism

Jain literature too mentions Pūraṇa Kassapa, Makkhali Gosāla and Sañjaya Belaṭṭhaputta. During the life of Buddha, Mahavira and the Buddha were leaders of their śramaṇa orders. Nigaṇṭha Nātaputta refers to Mahāvīra.

According to Pande, Jainas were the same as the Niganthas mentioned in the Buddhist texts, and they were a well established sect when Buddha began preaching. He states, without identifying supporting evidence, that "Jainas" appear to have belonged to the non-Vedic Munis and Sramanas who may have been ultimately connected with pre-Vedic civilization". The śramaṇa system is believed by a majority of Jaina scholars to have been of independent origin and not a protest movement of any kind, were led by Jaina thinkers, and were pre-Buddhist and pre-Vedic.

Some scholars posit that the Indus Valley civilisation symbols may be related to later Jain statues, and the bull icon may have a connection to Rishabhanatha. According to Dundas, outside of the Jain tradition, historians date the Mahavira as about contemporaneous with the Buddha in the 5th-century BCE, and accordingly the historical Parshvanatha, based on the c. 250-year gap, is placed in 8th or 7th century BCE.

Buddhism

It was as a śramaṇa that the Buddha left his father's palace and practised austerities. Gautama Buddha, after fasting nearly to death by starvation, regarded extreme austerities and self-mortification as useless or unnecessary in attaining enlightenment, recommending instead a "Middle Way" between the extremes of hedonism and self-mortification. Devadatta, a cousin of Gautama, caused a split in the Buddhist sangha by demanding more rigorous practices.

The Buddhist movement chose a moderate ascetic lifestyle. This was in contrast to Jains, who continued the tradition of stronger austerity, such as fasting and giving away all property including clothes and thus going naked, emphasizing that complete dedication to spirituality includes turning away from material possessions and any cause for evil karma. The moderate ascetic precepts, states Collins, likely appealed to more people and widened the base of people wanting to become Buddhists. Buddhism also developed a code for interaction of world-pursuing lay people and world-denying Buddhist monastic communities, which encouraged continued relationship between the two. Collins states, for example, that two rules of the vinaya (monastic code) were that a person could not join a monastic community without parent's permission, and that at least one son remained with each family to care for that family. Buddhism also combined the continuing interaction, such as giving alms to renunciants, in terms of merit gained for good rebirth and good karma by the lay people. This code played a historic role in its growth, and provided a means for reliable alms (food, clothing) and social support for Buddhism.

Randall Collins states that Buddhism was more a reform movement within the educated religious classes, composed mostly of Brahmins, rather than a rival movement from outside these classes. In early Buddhism, the largest number of monastics were originally brahmins, and virtually all were recruited from the two upper classes of society – brahmins and kshatriyas.

Ājīvika
Ājīvika was founded in the 5th century BCE by Makkhali Gosala, as a śramaṇa movement and a major rival of early Buddhism and Jainism. Ājīvikas were organised renunciates who formed discrete communities.

The Ājīvikas reached the height of their prominence in the late 1st millennium BCE, then declined, yet continued to exist in south India until the 14th Century CE, as evidenced by inscriptions found in southern India. Ancient texts of Buddhism and Jainism mention a city in the first millennium BCE named Savatthi (Sanskrit Śravasti) as the hub of the Ājīvikas; it was located in what is now the North Indian state of Uttar Pradesh. In later part of the common era, inscriptions suggests that the Ājīvikas had a significant presence in the South Indian state of Karnataka and the Kolar district of Tamil Nadu.

Original scriptures of the Ājīvika school of philosophy once existed, but these are unavailable and probably lost. Their theories are extracted from mentions of Ājīvikas in the secondary sources of ancient Indian literature. Scholars question whether Ājīvika philosophy has been fairly and completely summarized in these secondary sources, written by ancient Buddhist and Jaina scholars, who represented competing and adversarial philosophies to Ājīvikas.

Conflict between śramaṇa movements
According to the 2nd century CE text Ashokavadana, the Mauryan emperor Bindusara was a patron of the Ajivikas, and it reached its peak of popularity during this time. Ashokavadana also mentions that Bindusara's son Ashoka converted to Buddhism, became enraged at a picture that depicted Buddha in negative light, and issued an order to kill all the Ajivikas in Pundravardhana. Around 18,000 followers of the Ajivika sect were executed as a result of this order.

Jaina texts mention separation and conflict between Mahavira and Gosala, accusation of contemptuous comments, and an occasion where the Jaina and Ajivika monastic orders "came to blows". However, given the texts alleging conflict and portraying Ajivikas and Gosala in negative light were written centuries after the incident by their śramaṇa opponents, and given the versions in Buddhist and Jaina texts are different, the reliability of these stories, states Basham, is questionable.

Philosophy

Jain philosophy

Jainism derives its philosophy from the teachings and lives of the twenty-four Tirthankaras, of whom Mahavira was the last. Acharyas Umaswati, Kundakunda, Haribhadra,  and others further developed and reorganized Jain philosophy in its present form. The distinguishing features of Jain philosophy are its belief in the independent existence of soul and matter, predominance of karma, the denial of a creative and omnipotent God, belief in an eternal and uncreated universe, a strong emphasis on nonviolence, an accent on anekantavada and morality and ethics based on liberation of the soul. The Jain philosophy of anekantavada and syādvāda, which posits that the truth or reality is perceived differently from different points of view, and that no single point of view is the complete truth, have made very important contributions to ancient Indian philosophy, especially in the areas of skepticism and relativity.

Usage in Jain texts
Jain monastics are known as śramaṇas while lay practitioners are called śrāvakas. The religion or code of conduct of the monks is known as the śramaṇa dharma. Jain canons like Ācāranga Sūtra and other later texts contain many references to Sramanas.

Ācāranga Sūtra
One verse of the Ācāranga sūtra defines a good śramaṇa:

The chapter on renunciation contains a śramaṇa vow of non-possession:

The Ācāranga Sūtra gives three names of Mahavira, the twenty fourth Tirthankara, one of which was Śramaṇa:

Sūtrakrtanga
Another Jain canon, Sūtrakrtanga describes the śramaṇa as an ascetic who has taken Mahavrata, the five great vows:

The Sūtrakrtanga records that prince, Ardraka, who became disciple to Mahavira, arguing with other heretical teachers, told Makkhali Gosala the qualities of śramaṇas:

Buddhist philosophy

Buddha initially practiced severe austerities, fasting himself nearly to death of starvation. However, he later considered extreme austerities and self-mortification as unnecessary and recommended a "Middle Way" between the extremes of hedonism and self-mortification.

The Brahmajāla Sutta mentions many śramaṇas with whom Buddha disagreed. For example, in contrast to Sramanic Jains whose philosophical premise includes the existence of an Atman (self, soul) in every being, Buddhist philosophy denies that there is any self or soul. This concept called Anatta (or Anatman) is a part of Three Marks of existence in Buddhist philosophy, the other two being Dukkha (suffering) and Anicca (impermanence). According to Buddha, states Laumakis, everything lacks inherent existence. Buddhism is a transtheistic philosophy, which is especially concerned with pratītyasamutpāda (dependent origination) and śūnyatā (emptiness or nothingness).

From rock edicts, it is found that both Brahmans as well as śramaṇas enjoyed equal sanctity.

Ajivika philosophy
The Ājīvika school is known for its Niyati doctrine of absolute determinism, the premise that there is no free will, that everything that has happened, is happening and will happen is entirely preordained and a function of cosmic principles. Ājīvika considered the karma doctrine as a fallacy. Ajivika metaphysics included a theory of atoms similar to the Vaisheshika school, where everything was composed of atoms, qualities emerged from aggregates of atoms, but the aggregation and nature of these atoms was predetermined by cosmic forces. Ājīvikas were atheists and rejected the epistemic authority of the Vedas, but they believed that in every living being there is an ātman – a central premise of Hinduism and Jainism as well.

Comparison of philosophies
The śramaṇa traditions subscribed to diverse philosophies, significantly disagreeing with each other as well as orthodox Indian philosophy (six schools of Hindu philosophy). The differences ranged from a belief that every individual has a soul (self, atman) to asserting that there is no soul, from axiological merit in a frugal ascetic life to that of a hedonistic life, from a belief in rebirth to asserting that there is no rebirth.

A denial of the epistemic authority of the Vedas and Upanishads was one of the several differences between Sramanic philosophies and orthodox Hinduism. Jaini states that while authority of vedas, belief in a creator, path of ritualism and social system of heredity ranks, made up the cornerstones of Brahminal schools, the path of ascetic self-mortification was the main characteristic of all the Sramanic schools.

In some cases when the Sramanic movements shared the same philosophical concepts, the details varied. In Jainism, for example, Karma is based on materialist element philosophy, where Karma is the fruit of one's action conceived as material particles which stick to a soul and keep it away from natural omniscience. The Buddha conceived Karma as a chain of causality leading to attachment of the material world and hence to rebirth. The Ajivikas were fatalists and elevated Karma as inescapable fate, where a person's life goes through a chain of consequences and rebirths until it reaches its end. Other śramaṇa movements such as those led by Pakkudha Kaccayana and Purana Kashyapa, denied the existence of Karma.

Influences on Indian culture
The śramaṇa traditions influenced and were influenced by Hinduism and by each other. According to some scholars, the concept of the cycle of birth and death, the concept of samsara and the concept of liberation may quite possibly be from śramaṇa or other ascetic traditions. Obeyesekere suggests that tribal sages in the Ganges valley may instead have inspired the ideas of samsara and liberation, just like rebirth ideas that emerged in Africa and Greece. O'Flaherty states that there isn't enough objective evidence to support any of these theories.

It is in the Upanishadic period that Sramanic theories influence the Brahmanical theories. While the concepts of Brahman and Atman (Soul, Self) can be consistently traced back to pre-Upanishadic layers of Vedic literature, the heterogeneous nature of the Upanishads show infusions of both social and philosophical ideas, pointing to evolution of new doctrines, likely from the Sramanic movements.

Śramaṇa traditions brought concepts of Karma and Samsara as central themes of debate. Śramaṇa views were influential to all schools of Indian philosophies. Concepts, such as karma and reincarnation may have originated in the śramaṇa or the renunciant traditions, and then become mainstream. There are multiple theories of possible origins of concepts such as Ahimsa, or non-violence. The Chāndogya Upaniṣad, dated to about the 7th century BCE, in verse 8.15.1, has the earliest evidence for the use of the word Ahimsa in the sense familiar in Hinduism (a code of conduct). It bars violence against "all creatures" (sarvabhuta) and the practitioner of Ahimsa is said to escape from the cycle of metempsychosis (CU 8.15.1). According to some scholars, such as D. R. Bhandarkar, the Ahimsa dharma of the Sramanas made an impression on the followers of Brahamanism and their law books and practices.

Theories on who influenced whom, in ancient India, remains a matter of scholarly debate, and it is likely that the different philosophies contributed to each other's development. Doniger summarizes the historic interaction between scholars of Vedic Hinduism and Sramanic Buddhism:

Hinduism
Randall Collins states that "the basic cultural framework for lay society which eventually became Hinduism" was laid down by Buddhism.

Modern Hinduism can be regarded as a combination of Vedic and śramaṇa traditions as it is substantially influenced by both traditions. Among the Astika schools of Hinduism, Vedanta, Samkhya, and Yoga philosophies influenced and were influenced by the śramaṇa philosophy. As Geoffrey Samuel notes, 

Some Brahmins joined the śramaṇa movement such as Cānakya and Sāriputta. Similarly, a group of eleven Brahmins accepted Jainism and become Mahavira's chief disciples or ganadharas.

Patrick Olivelle suggests that the Hindu ashrama system of life, created probably around the 4th-century BCE, was an attempt to institutionalize renunciation within the Brahmanical social structure. This system gave complete freedom to adults to choose what they want to do, whether they want to be householders or sannyasins (ascetics), the monastic tradition was a voluntary institution. This voluntary principle, states Olivelle, was the same principle found in Buddhist and Jain monastic orders at that time.

In Western literature
Various possible references to "śramaṇas", with the name more or less distorted, have appeared in ancient Western literature.

Clement of Alexandria (150–211)
Clement of Alexandria makes several mentions of the śramaṇas, both in the context of the Bactrians and the Indians:

Porphyry (233–305)
Porphyry extensively describes the habits of the śramaṇas, whom he calls "Samanaeans", in his "On Abstinence from Animal Food" Book IV . He says his information was obtained from "the Babylonian Bardesanes, who lived in the times of our fathers, and was familiar with those Indians who, together with Damadamis, were sent to Caesar."

On entering the order

On food and living habits

On life and death

In contemporary Western culture
German novelist Hermann Hesse, long interested in Eastern, especially Indian, spirituality, wrote Siddhartha, in which the main character becomes a Samana upon leaving his home.

See also
 Bhikkhu
 Bhikkhuni
 Fakir
 Hermit
 Mahajanapadas
 Sadhu
 Śrāmaṇera
 Yogi
 Yogini

Notes

References

Citations

Sources

 
 
 Bhaskar, Bhagchandra Jain (1972). Jainism in Buddhist Literature. Alok Prakashan: Nagpur. Available on-line at http://jainfriends.tripod.com/books/jiblcontents.html. [Note that the on-line version is misattributed to Dr. Hiralal Jain who solely wrote this text's foreword.]
 

 

 

 

 Hesse, Hermann (1992). Siddhartha (Novel).

 
 
 http://www.herenow4u.net/index.php?id=65998 Antiquity of Jainism : Professor Mahavir Saran Jain

 

 , Bhikkhu (trans.) and Bodhi, Bhikkhu (ed.) (2001). The Middle-Length Discourses of the Buddha: A Translation of the Majjhima Nikāya. Boston: Wisdom Publications. .

  Google Books

 

  A general on-line search engine for the PED is available at dsal.uchicago.edu.

 
 Thanissaro Bhikkhu (trans.) (1997). Samaññaphala Sutta: The Fruits of the Contemplative Life (DN 2). Available on-line at accesstoinsight.org.

 

 

Buddhist monasticism
Jain religious occupations